The 2008 League of Ireland Cup was the 35th staging of the League of Ireland knockout competition. It was won by Derry City.

Twenty four clubs participated in this year's competition. The twelve Premier Division and ten First Division clubs were joined by Kildrum Tigers, the 2007 Ulster Senior League champions, and the Kerry District League representative side. For both the First and Second rounds of the competition, all participating clubs were split into four regional pools with the further rounds of the competition having an open draw.

The 2008 eircom League of Ireland Cup officially kicked off on the Bank Holiday weekend of Monday, 24 March 2008 when 14 eircom league clubs were joined by Kildrum Tigers and Kerry in the First Round. Bohemians, Cork City, Drogheda United and St. Patrick's Athletic all received a bye into the Second Round of the competition due to their future participation in European competitions. Four more clubs received a bye into the Second Round as a result of an open draw: Derry City, Finn Harps, Limerick 37 and UCD.

The competition ran until late September, with the final taking place on Saturday, 27 September 2008 at Ferrycarrig Park.  where Derry City delivered a spectacular performance to defeat hosts Wexford Youths 6–1.

First round

Pool A

|}

Pool B

|}

Pool C

|}

Pool D

|}

Second round

Pool A

|}

Pool B

|}

Pool C

|}

Pool D

|}

Quarterfinals
The matches were played on Tuesday, 1 July 2008.

|}

Semifinals

Final

External links
 Official website

References

League of Ireland Cup seasons
3
Cup